Costa Rica competed at the 2020 Summer Paralympics in Tokyo, Japan, from 24 August to 5 September 2021.

Medalists

Archery

Athletics 

DQ: Disqualified | Q: Qualified by place or standard based on overall position after heats  | DNA: Did not advance | N/A: Not available, stage was not contested | PB: Personal Best | PR: Paralympic Record

Cycling 

Costa Rica sent one cyclist after successfully getting a slot in the 2018 UCI Nations Ranking Allocation quota for the Americas.

Swimming 

DSQ: Disqualified | DNA: Did not advance

Table tennis

Taekwondo

Wheelchair tennis

Costa Rica qualified one player entry for wheelchair tennis. Jose Pablo Gil qualified by receiving the bipartite commission invitation allocation quota.

See also
Costa Rica at the 2020 Summer Olympics
Costa Rica at the Paralympics

References 

2020
Nations at the 2020 Summer Paralympics
2021 in Costa Rican sport